In mathematics, overconvergent modular forms are special p-adic modular forms that are elements of certain  p-adic Banach spaces (usually infinite dimensional) 
containing classical spaces of modular forms as subspaces.  They were introduced by Nicholas M. Katz in 1972.

References

Robert F. Coleman, Classical and overconvergent modular forms. Les Dix-huitièmes Journées Arithmétiques (Bordeaux, 1993). J. Théor. Nombres Bordeaux 7 (1995), no. 1, 333--365. 
Robert F. Coleman Classical and Overconvergent Modular Forms of Higher Level, J. Theor. Nombres Bordeaux 9 (1997), no. 2, 395-403.
Katz, Nicholas M. p-adic properties of modular schemes and modular forms.  Modular functions of one variable, III (Proc. Internat. Summer School, Univ. Antwerp, Antwerp, 1972),  pp. 69-190. Lecture Notes in Mathematics, Vol. 350, Springer, Berlin, 1973.
Modular forms